Joseph Anthony DiPietro (born July 19, 1951) is the former president of the University of Tennessee system, who served from 2011 to 2018.

Early life and education
DiPietro was born in Steubenville, Ohio to Alphonso and Luisa DiPietro. He graduated from the University of Illinois at Urbana–Champaign in 1974 and later received a Doctor of Veterinary Medicine degree from UIUC College of Veterinary Medicine in 1976 and a master's degree in 1980.

Career
In 2010, after the resignation of John D. Petersen, DiPietro was chosen to be the 25th president of the University of Tennessee and 8th president of the University of Tennessee system.

References

External links
 Office of the President

1951 births
Living people
Presidents of the University of Tennessee system
University of Illinois College of Veterinary Medicine alumni